Donald Maka (born 29 January 1995 in New Zealand) is a New Zealand rugby union player who plays for the  in Super Rugby. His playing position is hooker. He has signed for the Chiefs wider training squad in 2020.

Reference list

External links
itsrugby.co.uk profile

1995 births
New Zealand rugby union players
Living people
Rugby union hookers
Taranaki rugby union players
Counties Manukau rugby union players
Chiefs (rugby union) players